Cussac is a commune in the Haute-Vienne department in the Nouvelle-Aquitaine region in western France. Inhabitants are known as Cussacois.

It has a supermarket, garden centre, clothes shops, chemist, Doctors, opticians, bakery, library, bars and restaurants.

The town is situated in the Parc naturel régional Périgord Limousin. There are many places for walking. There are plenty of lakes and rivers for fishing.

Unlike many villages in the area this village is increasing in population and investments are being made by the Mayor.

The nearest airport Limoges is about 45 mins away by car.

See also
 Communes of the Haute-Vienne department

References

Communes of Haute-Vienne
Angoumois